Karakostas is a surname. Notable people with the surname include:

Giorgos Karakostas (born 1984), Greek footballer
Nikos Karakostas (born 1976), Greek footballer
Pavlos Karakostas (1937-2002), Greek author 

Greek-language surnames
Surnames